Silver wedding or Silver Wedding may refer to:
Silver Wedding (novel), a 1988 novel by Maeve Binchy
House of the Silver Wedding, the archaeological remains of a Roman house in Pompeii
Silver wedding, a 25th wedding anniversary